Achorion is an obsolete genus of dermatophyte fungus.

The species previously belonging to genus Achorion have been moved to other genera. Some notable species include:

 A. quinckeanum — now named Trichophyton quinckeanum, the species which causes favus in mice.
 A. schoenleinii — now named Trichophyton schoenleinii, or "Schönlein's tricophyton", the species which causes favus in humans.
 Other pathogenic fungi occasionally found in humans:
A. arloingi, now called Aleurisma arloingi
A. gypseum, now called Microsporum gypseum

Sources  
 American Illustrated Medical Dictionary (Philadelphia and London, 1938)

Ascomycota genera
Parasitic fungi